Esra Sibel Tezkan (born February 23, 1993) is a Turkish-German female football defender currently playing in the German Women's Regional League of the Middle Rhine for 1. FFC Bergisch Gladbach 2009. She is part of the Turkey women's national football team.

Family life
Esra Sibel Tezkan was born to a Turkish immigrant father and a German mother in Bremerhaven, Germany, on February 23, 1993. She was supported in playing football by her father, a professor of geophysics at the University of Cologne, who is an amateur footballer as well. She has two older brothers, one a footballer and the other performing athletics.

Playing career
Her father always took her to football matches when he was playing so she became interested in football at an early age. She began playing football with boys because no girls were available to play with. At age five, her father registered her with a club where she had to play again with boys. At eleven, she was transferred to the women's side of SC Fortuna Köln in her home town. She finds that her time playing with boys has contributed positively to her strength.

Club
After four years with SC Fortuna Köln, Tezkan moved at age fifteen to Bayer 04 Leverkusen.

In the 2013–14 season, she signed for 1. FFC Bergisch Gladbach 2009, where she currently plays in the Frauen-Mittelrheinliga (Women's League of the Middle Rhine).

International
Tezkan was discovered for the Turkey women's national team by Bilgin Defterli, a Turkish women's footballer, who moved from Turkey to Germany for her professional football career.

Tezkan was admitted to the Turkey girls' U-17 team debuting in the International Women's Football Friendship Tournament against Bulgaria on June 27, 2010. She was capped four times for the Turkey girls' U-17 team.

On September 11, 2010, she appeared for the first time in the Turkey women's U-19 team playing at the 2011 UEFA Women's U-19 Championship First qualifying round – Group 9 match against Romania. She took part at the 2011 UEFA Women's U-19 Championship Second qualifying round – Group 3 in the 2011 Kuban Spring Tournament and 2012 UEFA Women's Under-19 Championship – Group A matches. She was capped in 13 games with the Turkey women's U-19 team.

Tezkan played once for the Turkey women's U-21 team in a friendly match against Belgium on November 26, 2014.

On February 26, 2015, she took part in the friendly game of the Turkey women's team against Georgia. She played at the UEFA Women's Euro 2017 qualifying Group 5 matches for Turkey.

References

External links
 
 

Living people
1993 births
Sportspeople from Bremerhaven
Footballers from Bremen (state)
German people of Turkish descent
Women's association football defenders
German women's footballers
Bayer 04 Leverkusen (women) players
Turkish women's footballers
Turkey women's international footballers